The Voisin Type Bordeaux was an aircraft built by Voisin Frères in 1910, so-called because it was used by Juan Bielovucic to make a record-breaking flight from Paris to Bordeaux.  The design differed significantly from previous Voisin designs in eliminating the forward-mounted elevator.

Design and development
The Type Bordeaux was a two-bay equal span pusher configuration biplane powered by a Gnome Omega 7 cylinder rotary engine driving an aluminium bladed Voisin propeller mounted at the rear of the uncovered wooden nacelle.  The tail surfaces, carried on four wire-braced steel booms, consisted of a horizontal stabiliser and elevator mounted between the upper pair of booms with a single centrally mounted rudder beneath it.  The structure made extensive use of steel tubing and the flying surfaces were covered with "Continental" brand rubberised fabric.  Lateral control was effected by large D-shaped ailerons mounted on the upper wing: these were controlled by foot pedals.  The rudder and elevator were activated by a control wheel which was turned to control the rudder and moved forwards and backwards to control the elevator. It had a tricycle undercarriage consisting of a pair of mainwheels mounted on sprung steel struts below the wing and a nosewheel below the front of the nacelle, although the aircraft at rest rested on the two mainwheels and skids mounted at the rear of the lower pair of tailbooms.

The type became famous after a flight between Paris and Bordeaux made in September 1910 by Juan Bielovucic, who intended to compete in an aviation meet being held in Bordeaux and flew there from Paris in order to save the expense of sending the aircraft by rail.  The  flight was made in four stages (Paris–Orléans, Orléans–Châtellerault, Châtellerault–Angoulême and Angoulême–Bordeaux) spread over three days, in a total flying time of 6 hrs. 15 mins.  This set a new record for cross-country flight, and Bielovucic was given a medal by the Bordeaux Departmental Assembly.

The design was later refined to become the two-seat 1911 Voisin Type de Tourism.

Specifications

References

Notes

Bibliography

Opdycke, Leonard E  French Aeroplanes Before the Great War  Atglen, PA: Schiffer, 1999

External links

Single-engined pusher aircraft
1910s French sport aircraft
Biplanes
B
Aircraft first flown in 1910
Rotary-engined aircraft